The Ideal Schoolmaster is a 1932 Czech comedy film directed by Martin Frič.

Cast
 Karel Lamač as Karel Suchý, professor
 Anny Ondra as Vera Matysová (as Anny Ondráková)
 Oscar Marion as Rudolf Junek (as Oskar Marion)
 Theodor Pištěk as Director school
 Svetla Svozilová as Dr. Plásilová
 Antonie Nedošinská as Aunte
 Valentin Sindler as Jecmínek, Janitor
 Čeněk Šlégl as Karel Domin
 Jaroslav Marvan as Suchého spoluzák
 Karel Postranecký as Friend
 Ladislav Hemmer as Friend

References

External links
 

1932 films
1932 comedy films
1930s Czech-language films
Czech black-and-white films
Czechoslovak black-and-white films
Films directed by Martin Frič
Czechoslovak multilingual films
Czechoslovak comedy films
1932 multilingual films
1930s Czech films